Hōkō-ji is the name of a number of Buddhist temples in Japan, including:
, a Tendai temple in Kyoto
, a Rinzai temple in Shizuoka Prefecture
, Another name for Asuka-dera; see also Gangō-ji
, an archaic name for Kōryū-ji, a Shingon temple in Kyoto

Other Japanese temples named "Hōkō-ji" include:
 in Miki City, Hyōgo Prefecture dates from the 7th century
 in Enzan, Yamanashi Prefecture dates from the 12th century
 near Kamogawa, Chiba Prefecture dates from the 13th century

Temples named "Hōkō-ji" in the United States include:
Hōkō-ji (Taos) in Taos County, New Mexico